László Varga (born 19 April 1936) is a Hungarian Calvinist pastor and politician, member of the National Assembly (MP) from Fidesz–KDNP Bács-Kiskun County Regional List between 2010 and 2014.

References

1936 births
Living people
Hungarian Calvinist and Reformed Christians
Christian Democratic People's Party (Hungary) politicians
Members of the National Assembly of Hungary (2010–2014)
People from Kecskemét